Lundy Siegriest (1925 - November 13, 1985) was an American painter.

Life
Siegriest was born in 1925 in Oakland, California. His father, Louis Siegriest, was a painter, as was his stepmother, Edna Stoddart. Siegriest graduated from the California College of the Arts in Oakland.

Siegriest became a painter in his own right. He was initially a realist and later became an abstract expressionist. He returned to realism after being injured in a fall. He painted Western landscapes en plein air, and he often exhibited his work with his father.

Siegriest died of cancer on November 13, 1985 in Berkeley, California, at age 60. His work can be seen at the Fine Arts Museum of San Francisco, the Oakland Museum of California, and the Whitney Museum of American Art in New York City.

References

1925 births
1985 deaths
California College of the Arts alumni
American male painters
20th-century American painters
Abstract expressionist artists
American landscape painters
Artists of the American West
Deaths from cancer in California
20th-century American male artists